The Scuola del Santo or Scoletta was the headquarters of the Archconfraternity of St Anthony of Padua. It overhangs the churchyard of Basilica of Saint Anthony of Padua, next door to the St. George's Oratory.

The Confraternity built the Scoletta in 1427 and it was expanded in 1504 with the Sala Priorale (Prior's Room) decorated with a cycle of fifteen frescoes and three canvases, which were worked on by the young Titian between 1510 and 1511. He was entrusted with three frescos of miracles performed by Anthony of Padua, The Miracle of the Newborn, The Miracle of the Healed Foot and The Miracle of the Jealous Husband. The three large frescoes were painted by him between April and December 1511 in the main room of the Scuola del Santo – they were is first large-scale independent work. The raised arm of the wife in Husband  is sculpted in relief rather than painted illusionistically.

History 
The Archconfraternity began a few years after St Anthony's death and grew rapidly. During the 13th century its brothers used the 'Sala del Capitolo' as their meeting room, then the 'Cappella della Madonna Mora'. In the 15th century it decided to construct a new building on the edges of the churchyard of the Basilica of Sant'Antonio.

Today's Scuola is made up of the church on the ground floor (1427–1431) and the meeting room upstairs (1504). To the left of the entrance to the church is the neoclassical marble gravestone of Gasparo Gozzi, who died in 1786 – it was sculpted by Giuseppe Petrelli in 1834. Popes visiting Padua usually blessed the crowd from the church's loggia overlooking Piazza del Santo – these have included pope Pius VI in 1782, pope Pius VII in 1800 and pope John Paul II in 1982.

In 1736 the architect Giovanni Gloria built a small building linking the Scuola to the Oratory, with an elegant staircase connecting it to the meeting room. On the landing is a 15th century tempera on panel painting by an unknown artist showing St Anthony Intending to Write, in poor condition. The Sala priorale has a coffered ceiling by Giovanni Cavalieri, painted by Domenico Bottazzo between 1506 and 1510, making it contemporary with the wooden ceiling, the wardrobes and drawers by Girolamo da Piacenza. Gilded wooden frames subdivide the painted scenes.

List of works 
North wall, anticlockwise
 Titian, Miracle of the Newborn (1511)
 Francesco Vecellio (attributed to), Sant'Antonio fa trovare il cuore dell'usuraio nel forziere (1512)
 Gerolamo Tessari (attributed to), The mule prostrating itself before the Blessed Sacrament (1515)
 Filippo da Verona, Sant'Antonio appears to the blessed Luca Belludi, preaching the immediate liberation of Padua from the rule of Ezzelino 
 Gerolamo Tessari, Transit of Saint Anthony (1513)
 Bartolomeo Montagna, Canonical recognition of the remains of St Anthony (1512)
 Gerolamo Tessari, Miracle of the glass beaker
 Giovanni Antonio Requesta detto il Corona, Sant'Antonio affronta il tiranno Ezzelino a Verona (1510–1511)
 Domenico Campagnola, Sant'Antonio e San Francesco (1533). Sull'altare una Madonna col Bambino in terracotta policroma del Briosco
 Giovanni Antonio Requesta detto il Corona, Saint Anthony reaches Padua, where he brought peace among the citizens by the force and sweetness of his preaching
 Titian, Miracle of the Jealous Husband (to the right is the penitent man kneeling at the saint's feet) (1511)
 Titian, Miracle of the Healed Foot (1511)
 Gerolamo Tessari (attributed to), Saint Anthony raises from the dead a child who had fallen into boiling water (1524, divided in two parts by the window)
 Bartolomeo Montagna (attributed to), Resurrection of a young man assassinated for attesting to the innocence of the saint's father (16th century)
 Antonio Buttafuoco, Death of St Anthony (1775)
 Domenico Campagnola (attributed to), Risurrezione di una ragazza annegata (XVI secolo)
 Giovan Maria Frangipane (attributed to), St Anthony Raises a Drowned Child From the Dead (1511)
 Francesco Vecellio, brother of Titian (attributed to), Nicola da Stra, Guardian of the Archconfraternity, handing out blessed bread

References

Bibliography 
  Fr. A. Sartori, L'Arciconfraternita del Santo, Padova 1955.
 Charles Hope: The Attribution of Some Paduan Paintings of the Early Sixteenth Century, Artibus et Historiae, 1997, p. 81-99, .
 Sergio Rossetti Morosini, Tiziano Vecellio, Miracolo del marito geloso, 1511, in New findings in Titian's Fresco technique at the Scuola del Santo in Padua, The Art Bulletin March 1999, Volume LXXXI Number 1.
  Leopoldo Saracini, La Scuola del Santo, Ed. Messaggero, Padova 2009.
  Vergilio Gamboso, La basilica del Santo di Padova – Guida storico-artistica, Messaggero di Sant'Antonio Editrice, Padova.

External links 
 

Roman Catholic churches in Padua
Fresco paintings in Veneto
15th-century Roman Catholic church buildings in Italy